Harry Freedman is a British author who writes on history, religion and culture.

Career 
Born in London in 1950, Freedman is described by his publisher Bloomsbury  as Britain's leading author of popular works of Jewish culture and history. His book Leonard Cohen: The Mystical Roots of Genius discussing the spiritual and mystical sources that Leonard Cohen drew upon in his music was published in October 2021. The Washington Post described it as "brimming with insight.... peppered with many valuable observations" His forthcoming book, Britain's Jews, about Jewish life in Britain today, is due to be published by Bloomsbury in February 2023.

His previous book Reason To Believe: The Controversial Life of Rabbi Louis Jacobs was published in November 2020. It is a biography of the English Jewish rabbi and theologian whose views on revelation led him into conflict with the orthodox rabbinate in the 1950s and 1960s.

In 2019 he published Kabbalah: Secrecy, Scandal and the Soul. The book explores the history of the system of Jewish mysticism known as Kabbalah from its earliest origins to the present day.  "There is so much to ponder here and so little space to do it in. Which honestly renders Freedman’s bold attempt to do so an act bordering on the heroic."

His book The Murderous History of Bible Translations was published by Bloomsbury in 2016. The book discusses controversial Bible translations, many of which have led to religious conflict and violence.

He wrote The Talmud: A Biography, published by Bloomsbury in 2014. In the book he asserts that the Talmud is a classic of world literature and that its story is an account of one of the most important cultural, historical and religious works of our time. "Freedman writes with evocative brio"

In 2011 he published Jerusalem Imperilled, the first novel in a trilogy. Published only as an e-book, it tells the story of Levi, a young priest in Roman-occupied Jerusalem, who is captured and sent to Rome as a slave.

He published The Gospels' Veiled Agenda in December 2009. In it he asserted that the Gospels draw on Old Testament sources in order to present a picture of Jesus that resonated culturally with the 1st-century Jewish audience for whom the Gospels were intended. He claimed that the Holy Grail is mentioned in all four gospels and is a central icon in understanding Jesus' true agenda.

In his book, How to Get a Job in a Recession, Freedman advises how to look for jobs more successfully than everyone else. In his book and articles, he emphasizes that there are still plenty of new opportunities coming onto the market. He claims that even if there are fewer jobs in your particular industry, the chances of getting back to work quickly in another field are still high even in this new recruiting atmosphere.

Freedman’s academic qualifications include first and postgraduate degrees in psychology, philosophy and Aramaic.

Works 
 Leonard Cohen: The Mystical Roots of Genius (2021, ISBN 9781472987303)
 Reason To Believe: The Controversial Life of Rabbi Louis Jacobs (2020, 
 Kabbalah: Secrecy: Scandal and the Soul (2019)
 The Murderous History of Bible Translations (2016)
 The Talmud: A Biography (2014)
 Jerusalem Imperilled (2011, ASIN B006791GR4)
 The Gospels' Veiled Agenda (2009)
 How to Get a Job in a Recession'' (2009)

References

External links
 Harry Freedman Books
 Talmud Biography
 Harry Freedman author page at Bloomsbury

Writers from London
British writers
1950 births
Living people